Blastococcus colisei  is a Gram-positive bacterium from the genus of Blastococcus which has been isolated from limestone from the Amphitheatre of El Jem in El Jem, Tunisia.

References

External links
Type strain of Blastococcus colisei at BacDive -  the Bacterial Diversity Metadatabase

 

Bacteria described in 2017
Actinomycetia